Krista Bridges (born 4 November 1968) is a Canadian actress. She has appeared in more than 110 film and television productions since 1988, and received a Genie Award nomination for Best Supporting Actress at the 13th Genie Awards in 1992 for The Shower.

Selected filmography

Film

Television

References

External links 

1968 births
Living people
Canadian film actresses
Canadian television actresses
Actresses from Ontario